Berks County (Pennsylvania German: Barricks Kaundi) is a county in the Commonwealth of Pennsylvania. As of the 2020 census, the population was 428,849. The county seat is Reading.

The Schuylkill River, a  tributary of the Delaware River, flows through Berks County. The county is part of the Reading, PA metropolitan statistical area (MSA), which is included in the Delaware Valley or Greater Philadelphia metropolitan area or the Philadelphia-Reading-Camden, PA-NJ-DE-MD combined statistical area (CSA).

History
Reading developed during the 1740s when inhabitants of northern Lancaster County sent several petitions requesting that a separate county be established. With the help of German immigrant Conrad Weiser, the county was formed on March 11, 1752, from parts of Chester County, Lancaster County, and Philadelphia County.

It was named after the English county in which William Penn's family home lay, Berkshire, which is often abbreviated to Berks. Berks County began much larger than it is today. The northwestern parts of the county went to the founding of Northumberland County in 1772 and Schuylkill County in 1811, when it reached its current size. In 2005, Berks County was added to the Delaware Valley Planning Area due to a fast-growing population and close proximity to the other communities.

In 2016, the borough of Strausstown merged with Upper Tulpehocken Township. Strausstown is now a village within Upper Tulpehocken Township.

Geography
Most of the county is drained by the Schuylkill River, but an area in the northeast is drained by the Lehigh River via the Little Lehigh Creek and areas are drained by the Susquehanna River via the Swatara Creek in the northwest and the Conestoga River, which starts in Berks County between Morgantown and Elverson in the county's extreme south. It has a humid continental climate (Dfa except for some Dfb on Blue Mountain at the northern boundary and on Mount Penn) and the hardiness zone is mostly 6b, with 6a in some higher areas, and 7a along the Schuylkill in the southeastern part of the county.

Major roads and highways

Adjacent counties
 Schuylkill County (north)
 Lehigh County (northeast)
 Montgomery County (east)
 Chester County (southeast)
 Lancaster County (southwest)
 Lebanon County (west)

National protected area
 Hopewell Furnace National Historic Site

State protected area
 French Creek State Park

Demographics

As of the 2010 census, the county was 76.9% White non-Hispanic, 4.9% Black or African American, 0.3% Native American, 1.3% Asian, and 2.5% were two or more races. 16.4% of the population was of Hispanic or Latino ancestry. Historically there is a large Pennsylvania Dutch population. It is known as part of Pennsylvania Dutch Country. There were 411,442 people, 154,356 households, and 106,532 families residing in the county.

According to Muninet Guide's 2010 analysis, the median household income for Berks County is $54,105.

There were 154,356 households, out of which 33.1% had children under the age of 18 living with them, 52.1% were married couples living together, 12.0% had a female householder with no husband present, and 31.0% were non-families. 24.5% of all households were made up of individuals, and 10.3% had someone living alone who was 65 years of age or older. The average household size was 2.59 and the average family size was 3.08.

In the county, the population was spread out, with 23.9% under the age of 18, 9.9% from 18 to 24, 24.4% from 25 to 44, 27.3% from 45 to 64, and 14.5% who were 65 years of age or older. The median age was 39.1 years. For every 100 females there were 95.90 males. For every 100 females age 18 and over, there were 92.70 males.

Berks County is home to an Old Order Mennonite community consisting of about 160 families, located in the East Penn Valley near Kutztown and Fleetwood. The Old Order Mennonites first bought land in the area in 1949. In 2012, Old Order Mennonites bought two large farms in the Oley Valley. The Old Order Mennonites in the area belong to the Groffdale Conference Mennonite Church and use the horse and buggy as transportation. There are several farms in the area belonging to the Old Order Mennonite community and meetinghouses are located near Kutztown and Fleetwood.

2020 census

Metropolitan and Combined Statistical Area

The U.S. Office of Management and Budget has designated Berks County as the Reading, PA Metropolitan Statistical Area (MSA). As of the 2010 U.S. census the metropolitan area ranked 10th most populous in Pennsylvania and the 128th most populous in the U.S. with a population of 413,491. Berks County is also a part of the larger Philadelphia-Reading-Camden, PA-NJ-DE-MD Combined Statistical Area (CSA), which combines the populations of Berks County as well as several counties around Philadelphia and in the states of Delaware, Maryland, and New Jersey.  The combined statistical area is the largest in Pennsylvania and 8th most populous in the U.S. with a population of 7,067,807.

Government

County commissioners

 Christian Leinbach, Chair Republican
 Kevin Barnhardt, Vice Chair Democrat
 Michael S. Rivera, Republican

State Senate
 Judy Schwank, Democrat, Pennsylvania Senate, District 11
 Bob Mensch, Republican, Pennsylvania Senate, District 24
 Dave Argall, Republican, Pennsylvania Senate, District 29
 Katie Muth, Democrat, Pennsylvania Senate, District 44

State House of Representatives
 Barry Jozwiak, Republican, Pennsylvania House of Representatives, District 5
 David H. Zimmerman, Republican, Pennsylvania House of Representatives, District 99
 Jamie Barton, Republican, Pennsylvania House of Representatives, District 124
 Mark Rozzi, Democrat, Pennsylvania House of Representatives, District 126
 Manny Guzman Jr., Democrat, Pennsylvania House of Representatives, District 127
 Mark Gillen, Republican, Pennsylvania House of Representatives, District 128
 Johanny Cepeda-Freytiz, Democrat, Pennsylvania House of Representatives, District 129
 David Maloney, Republican, Pennsylvania House of Representatives, District 130

United States House of Representatives
 Madeleine Dean, Democratic, Pennsylvania's 4th congressional district
 Chrissy Houlahan, Democratic, Pennsylvania's 6th congressional district
 Dan Meuser, Republican, Pennsylvania's 9th congressional district

Politics
As of March 6, 2022 there are 259,209 registered voters in Berks County.
 Republican: 108,985 (42.05%)
 Democratic: 108,238 (41.76%)
 Independent: 30,623 (11.81%)
 Minor parties: 11,365 (4.38%)

In late January the Republican Party captured the total registration edge from the Democrats in Berks and already had the active-voter registration edge in 2022. The top of the statewide ticket in November 2022 saw Berks split its votes---Josh Shapiro for Governor and Mehmet Oz for US Senate.

|}

The first time since 1964 that a Democrat carried Berks in a Presidential election occurred in November 2008, with Barack Obama receiving 53.9% of the vote to John McCain's 44.7%. The other three statewide winners (Rob McCord for treasurer, Jack Wagner for auditor general, and Tom Corbett for attorney general) also carried it. While Republicans have controlled the commissioner majority most of the time and continue to control most county row offices, Democrats have become more competitive in Berks in recent years. In the 2012 Presidential election, Mitt Romney carried the county by approximately a one-percent margin, 49.6% to 48.6%, however, in 2016, Donald Trump carried Berks by a much larger margin of 52.9% to 42.7%.

Education

Colleges and universities
 Albright College
 Alvernia University
 Kutztown University of Pennsylvania
 Penn State Berks
 Reading Area Community College

Public school districts
School districts include:

 Antietam School District
 Boyertown Area School District
 Brandywine Heights Area School District
 Conrad Weiser Area School District
 Daniel Boone Area School District
 Exeter Township School District
 Fleetwood Area School District
 Governor Mifflin School District
 Hamburg Area School District
 Kutztown Area School District
 Muhlenberg School District
 Oley Valley School District
 Reading School District
 Schuylkill Valley School District
 Tulpehocken Area School District
 Twin Valley School District
 Upper Perkiomen School District
 Wilson School District
 Wyomissing Area School District

Private high schools
 Berks Christian School in Birdsboro
 Blue Mountain Academy, a Seventh-day Adventist boarding school in Tilden Township
 Conestoga Christian School in Morgantown, Pennsylvania
 Fairview Christian School in Reading
 Gateway Christian School in Mertztown
 The King's Academy in Mohrsville
 Berks Catholic High School in Reading
 Lighthouse Christian Academy in Lyons

Technical and trade schools
 Berks Technical Institute
 Pace Institute
 Reading Hospital School of Nursing
 Berks Career and Technology Center (east campus in Oley, west campus in Leesport)

Arts and culture
The Reading Public Museum is an art, science, and history museum.

The Reading Buccaneers Drum and Bugle Corps are an all-age drum corps based in Berks County.  The corps, founded in 1957, is a charter member Drum Corps Associates and an 11-time DCA World Champion.

Reading is home to Berks Opera Company, founded in 2007 as Berks Opera Workshop.

There are two Pennsylvania state parks and a Natural Area in Berks County.
 Nolde Forest Environmental Education Center is south of Reading on land once owned by Jacob Nolde, a prominent Reading businessman and Pennsylvania environmentalist.
 French Creek State Park, a former Recreational Demonstration Area, straddles the Berks and Chester County line.
 Ruth Zimmerman Natural Area, part of the William Penn Forest District in Oley.

There are two Pennsylvania Historic Sites in Berks County.
 Conrad Weiser Homestead near Womelsdorf
 Daniel Boone Homestead near Birdsboro

The Old Morlatton Village in Douglassville is maintained by the Historic Preservation Trust of Berks County. The village is composed of four historic structures: White Horse Inn, George Douglass Mansion, Bridge keeper's House, and the Mouns Jones House, constructed in 1716, which is the oldest recorded building in the county.

West Reading in home to the annual Art on the Avenue, which reached its 25th year in 2019.

Media 
Berks County has been home to several media sources, including:
 Berks Community Television (BCTV)
 Reading Eagle, a daily printed newspaper based in Reading, Pennsylvania
 WEEU, a local AM radio station
 WFMZ, a Local news channel that has offices in Berks County and covers South Eastern Pennsylvania
 WRFY-FM - (102.5 FM "Y102"), a commercial FM radio station licensed to serve Reading, Pennsylvania

Communities

Under Pennsylvania law, there are four types of incorporated municipalities: cities, boroughs, townships, and towns. The following cities, boroughs and townships are located in Berks County:

City
 Reading (county seat)

Boroughs

 Adamstown (mostly in Lancaster County)
 Bally
 Bechtelsville
 Bernville
 Birdsboro
 Boyertown
 Centerport
 Fleetwood
 Hamburg
 Kenhorst
 Kutztown
 Laureldale
 Leesport
 Lenhartsville
 Lyons
 Mohnton
 Mount Penn
 New Morgan
 Robesonia
 St. Lawrence
 Shillington
 Shoemakersville
 Sinking Spring
 Topton
 Wernersville
 West Reading
 Womelsdorf
 Wyomissing

Townships

 Albany
 Alsace
 Amity
 Bern
 Bethel
 Brecknock
 Caernarvon
 Centre
 Colebrookdale
 Cumru
 District
 Douglass
 Earl
 Exeter
 Greenwich
 Heidelberg
 Hereford
 Jefferson
 Longswamp
 Lower Alsace
 Lower Heidelberg
 Maidencreek
 Marion
 Maxatawny
 Muhlenberg
 North Heidelberg
 Oley
 Ontelaunee
 Penn
 Perry
 Pike
 Richmond
 Robeson
 Rockland
 Ruscombmanor
 South Heidelberg
 Spring
 Tilden
 Tulpehocken
 Union
 Upper Bern
 Upper Tulpehocken
 Washington
 Windsor

Census-designated places
Census-designated places are geographical areas designated by the U.S. Census Bureau for the purposes of compiling demographic data. They are not actual jurisdictions under Pennsylvania law. Other unincorporated communities, such as villages, may be listed here as well.

 Alleghenyville
 Alsace Manor
 Amity Gardens
 Baumstown
 Bethel
 Blandon
 Bowers
 Colony Park
 Dauberville
 Douglassville
 Dryville
 Edenburg
 Flying Hills
 Fox Chase
 Frystown
 Gibraltar
 Gouglersville
 Greenfields
 Grill
 Hereford
 Hyde Park
 Jacksonwald
 Kempton
 Kutztown University
 Lincoln Park
 Lorane
 Mertztown
 Mohrsville
 Montrose Manor
 Morgantown
 Mount Aetna
 Muhlenberg Park
 New Berlinville
 New Jerusalem
 New Schaefferstown
 Oley
 Pennside
 Pennwyn
 Rehrersburg
 Reiffton
 Riverview Park
 Schubert
 Shartlesville
 South Temple
 Springmont
 Spring Ridge
 Stony Creek Mills
 Stouchsburg
 Temple
 Virginville
 Walnuttown
 West Hamburg
 West Lawn
 West Wyomissing
 Whitfield

Unincorporated communities

 Brownsville
 Blue Marsh
 Cacoosing
 Geigertown
 Leinbachs
 North Heidelberg
 Pine Swamp
 Plowville
 Pricetown
 Scarlets Mill
 State Hill
 Strausstown
 Wooltown

Population ranking
The population ranking of the following table is based on the 2010 census of Berks County.

† county seat

CDP=census designated population

Notable people

 William Addams, former U.S. Congressman
 Priscilla Ahn, folk musician, singer, and songwriter
 John Barrasso, U.S. Senator
 Douglas Carter Beane, playwright
 Chad Billingsley, former professional baseball player, Los Angeles Dodgers and Philadelphia Phillies
 Daniel Boone, American pioneer, explorer, and frontiersman
 Kenny Brightbill, professional race car driver
 Steve Burns, musician and former Blue's Clues host
 James Henry Carpenter, Civil War sailor, officer, founder of Carpenter Technology Corporation
 Jack Coggins, illustrator, author and artist, lived in Boyertown from 1948 to 2006
 Rocky Colavito, former Major League Baseball player
 Kerry Collins, professional football player (Panthers, Saints, Giants, Raiders, Titans, and Colts)
 Michael Constantine, actor, star of Room 222 and My Big Fat Greek Wedding
 Amy Cuddy, Harvard psychologist and TED Talks speaker
 Lisa Eichhorn, actress
 Wayne Ellington, NBA Basketball Player
 Carl Furillo, former professional baseball player, Brooklyn/Los Angeles Dodgers
 John Henry Gilmore, Jr., former professional football player, Chicago Bears, New Orleans Saints, and Tampa Bay Buccaneers
 Jon Gosselin, reality television personality, Jon & Kate Plus 8
 Kate Gosselin, reality television personality, Jon & Kate Plus 8
 Keith Haring, former artist
 Chad Henne, football professional football player, Miami Dolphins
 Chris Hero, professional wrestler
 Joseph Hiester, governor of Pennsylvania 1820–1823
 Tommy Hinnershitz (1912–1999), auto racing pioneer
 Chad Hurley, co-founder of YouTube
 Mildred Jordan (1901–1982), novelist
 Chip Kidd (born 1964), book jacket designer at Knopf Publishing Group
 Abraham Lincoln (1744-1786), grandfather of 16th U.S. president Abraham Lincoln
 Matt Lytle (born 1975), professional football player
 Donyell Marshall, former NBA player
 James H. Maurer (1864-1944), Labor leader and two-time Vice Presidential nominee
 Kelly McGillis, actress, [Top Gun/Witness/The Accused]
 Gordon McKellen, Jr., former U.S. figure skating champion and Hall of Fame member
 Morton L. Montgomery (1846–1933), Reading attorney and author of multiple history books about Berks County
 Lenny Moore, NFL Hall of Fame
 Thomas Morris, Democratic politician, served in the United States Senate
 Jillian Murray (b. June 4, 1989), model and actress
 Frederick Augustus Muhlenberg, architect, founder of Muhlenberg Greene Architects, American military and political leader 1887–1980
 Jacob Nolde, conservationist
 Bodo Otto, Senior Surgeon of the Continental Army during the American Revolution (1711–1787)
 William Sands, U.S. Medal of Honor winner (Civil War)
 Martin Cruz Smith, novelist
 Carl Spaatz, World War II general
 Wallace Stevens, major American Modernist poet, October 2, 1879 – August 2, 1955
 Taylor Swift (born 1989), Grammy Award-winning country/pop singer-songwriter
 Ross Tucker, professional football player
 John Updike, writer, 1932–2009
 Lonnie Walker, NBA player
 Alex Anzalone (born 1994), Detroit Lions lineman
 Gus Yatron, former congressman from Pennsylvania

See also

 National Register of Historic Places listings in Berks County, Pennsylvania

Footnotes

Further reading
 F.W. Balthaser, The Story of Berks County, Pennsylvania. Reading, PA: Reading Eagle Press, 1925.
 D.B. Brunner, The Indians of Berks County, Pa., Being a Summary of all the Tangible Records of the Aborigines of Berks County, with Cuts and Descriptions of the Varieties of Relics Found within the County. Reading, PA: Eagle Book Print, 1897.
 Morton L. Montgomery, History of Berks County in Pennsylvania. Philadelphia: Everts, Peck & Richards, 1886.
 Morton L. Montgomery, History of Berks County, Pennsylvania, in the Revolution, from 1774 to 1783. Reading, PA: C.F. Haage, printer, 1894.
 Morton L. Montgomery, Political Hand-Book of Berks County, Pennsylvania, 1752–1883. Reading, PA: B.F. Owen, 1883.
 Morton L. Montgomery, School history of Berks County in Pennsylvania. Philadelphia: J.B. Rodgers Printing Co., 1889.
 Kathy M. Scogna, "The Birth of a County — 1752,". Historical Review of Berks County, Winter 2001–02.

External links

 

 
1752 establishments in Pennsylvania
Populated places established in 1752